Starless is the fourth major box set release from English progressive rock group King Crimson, released in 2014 by Discipline Global Mobile & Panegyric Records.

Over 23 CDs, 2 Blu-ray audio discs and 2 DVDAs, it is a limited edition box set featuring studio and live recordings many previously unreleased from King Crimson's celebrated mid-1970s live line-up.

It includes the 2011 stereo mix and 5.1 surround mix of Starless and Bible Black by Steven Wilson and Robert Fripp.

Track listing

References

External links 

 

King Crimson albums
2014 albums
Discipline Global Mobile albums